Favero is an Italian surname. Notable people with the surname include:

Luciano Favero (born 1957), Italian footballer
Mafalda Favero (1903–1981), Italian opera singer
Silvio Favero (1966–2021), Brazilian politician
Vito Favero (born 1932), Italian cyclist

Italian-language surnames